Dueña y Señora is a Puerto Rican telenovela based on La Dueña (a Venezuelan telenovela which experienced great success in 1984-85). It is produced by Telemundo Puerto Rico and Puerto Rico Vibra Inc., which intends to market it to the United States' Spanish-speaking residents as well.

History making
Dueña y Señora (Owner and Mistress), made Puerto Rican television history when it was released in August 2006, because it became the first Puerto Rican produced telenovela (Latin soap opera) since 1992. The telenovela's production was announced to the public on Puerto Rican written media, such as El Vocero and El Nuevo Dia newspapers.

Cast

Main Cast In Order of Appearance	 	 
|-Kaly Cordova || Pescador Asesino ..

International distribution
Unconfirmed reports state that Dueña y Señora will be distributed internationally by a German Production Company.

Remakes 
1984: La dueña (filmed in Venezuela and broadcast on VTV Canal 8)
2013: La Patrona (filmed in Mexico and broadcast on Telemundo)
2015 Santa Bárbara (filmed in Portugal and broadcast on TVI)
2018: La Patrona (filmed in Mexico and broadcast on Las Estrellas)

External links
telemundo-foros.kcl.net 
Puerto Rico Vibra
Dueña_y_Señora at Internet Movie Database

References

2006 telenovelas
2006 Puerto Rican television series debuts
2006 Puerto Rican television series endings
Puerto Rican telenovelas
Telemundo telenovelas
American television series based on Venezuelan television series